The Bar may refer to:
 Bar (law), the legal profession as an institution
 The Bar (franchise), a reality competition television franchise
 The Bar (film), a 2017 Spanish film
 The Bar (painting), by John Brack
 The Bar (professional wrestling), a WWE professional wrestling tag team
 The Bar (radio network), a music network produced by Waitt Radio Networks
 The Bar, a 1906 book by Margery Williams
 The Bar, a theatre space in Holden Street Theatres, Adelaide, Australia

See also
Bar (disambiguation)